The 1942 United States Senate special election in Colorado took place on November 3, 1942. Democratic Senator Alva B. Adams died in office on December 1, 1941, and Republican Governor Ralph L. Carr appointed Denver oilman Eugene Millikin to fill the vacancy. Millikin ran for re-election for the remainder of Adams's term. He was opposed in the general election by James A. Marsh, the former chairman of the state Democratic Party. Aided in part by the nationwide Republican landslide, Millikin easily defeated Marsh to serve out the remainder of the term.

Democratic primary

Candidates
 James A. Marsh, former Chairman of the Colorado Democratic Party

Campaign
Most of the competitive Democratic primaries in 1942 emerged in the races for the regular Senate seat and for Governor. Former state party chairman James A. Marsh was seen as the frontrunner for the special election, along with Oscar Chapman, the U.S. Assistant Secretary of the Interior and Alva Adams's former campaign manager. However, Chapman ultimately announced that he would not run, and Marsh won the nomination unopposed.

Results

Republican primary

Candidates
 Eugene Millikin, incumbent U.S. Senator

Results

General election

Results

References

Colorado 1942
Colorado 1942
1942 Special
Colorado Special
United States Senate Special
United States Senate 1942